I Was Born to Love You is an album released by Eric Carmen in 2000.  It was originally released in Japan as Winter Dreams in 1997.  Then-former and now-reunited Raspberries bandmate Wally Bryson sat in on guitar for two of the songs: "Every Time I Make Love to You" and "I Could Really Love You". It stands as his most recent album to date.

The track "Someone That You Loved Before" was covered by Diana Ross on her 1999 LP Every Day Is a New Day.

Track listing
 "I Was Born to Love You" (Eric Carmen, Andy Goldmark)
 "Someone That You Loved Before" (Eric Carmen, Diane Warren)
 "Every Time I Make Love to You" (Eric Carmen, Andy Goldmark, Steve Kipner)
 "Cartoon World" (Eric Carmen, John Wesley Harding)
 "Almost Paradise" (Eric Carmen, Dean Pitchford)
 "Top Down Summer" (Eric Carmen, Dean Pitchford)
 "Isn't It Romantic" (Eric Carmen, Andy Goldmark)
 "I Could Really Love You" (Eric Carmen, Dean Pitchford)
 "Caroline, No" (Japan release only) (Brian Wilson, Tony Asher)
 "I Wanna Take Forever Tonight" (Eric Carmen, Dean Pitchford)
 "Walk Away Renée" (Michael Brown, Bob Calilli, Tony Sansone)

Eric Carmen albums
2000 compilation albums
Rhino Records compilation albums